Dario Antonio Úsuga David (born September 15, 1971) is a Colombian drug trafficker. Úsuga is the leader of the drug trafficking group the Gulf Clan (Spanish: Los Urabeños), and is known by his nickname Otoniel. He is accused of sending dozens of shipments of cocaine to the United States, killing police officers, recruiting minors, and sexually abusing children among other crimes. After being sought by Colombian authorities for a decade, he was captured and arrested in October 2021, and extradited to the United States in May 2022. At the time of his capture, 132 warrants for his arrest had been issued.

Early affiliations

Born on September 15, 1971, in Necoclí, in northwestern Colombia, Dario Antonio Úsuga David, known as "Otoniel", came from a modest peasant family. In 1989, at the age of 18, he joined the Popular Liberation Army (EPL), a guerrilla group with a strong presence in the region that sought to defend poor peasants against landowners and the government. "He was not a revolutionary. But it was all there was and he went with them," his mother explained in a 2015 interview with a journalist. The EPL signed a peace agreement with the government two years later, in 1991, and its members returned to civilian life. He then joined the United Self-Defences of Colombia (Autodefensas Unidas de Colombia, or AUC), a Colombian far-right paramilitary and drug trafficking group.

In 2005, Úsuga began working for Daniel Rendón Herrera, the then leader of the Los Urabeños drug trafficking group. Otoniel and his brother Giovanni (born Juan de Dios Usuga) took control of the Los Urabeños in 2009. After Giovanni was shot and killed during a police raid, Otoniel took full leadership of the group.

Search
Colombian police have sought the arrest of Úsuga since around 2011. In 2015, the BBC reported that 1,200 Colombian anti-drug police were involved in the search for Úsuga. The same year a Colombian police helicopter searching for Úsuga crashed, killing 18. In 2017 the US Department of State offered a $5 million reward for information leading to his arrest. Also in 2017, Colombian anti-trafficking police dropped flyers from helicopters offering a $5 million reward for information leading to his capture. 
In 2017 Úsuga published a video on Facebook in which he offered to submit to  a negotiated surrender.

In early 2021 Colombian authorities intensified their search efforts for Úsuga, following heightened levels of cocaine production.

Capture
Early in October 2021, Colombian intelligence officials identified 
Úsuga's likely hideout as being in the Urabá, Antioquia region of north-western Colombia, near the Panamanian border. The detection of his location was facilitated by the tracking of cartel members who were bringing him a specific type of medication to treat his kidney disease. Early on the morning of October 22, a military team codenamed El Blanco surrounded his believed hiding place with hundreds of troops, 20 helicopters, 10 unmanned surveillance drones. The capture involved blocking rivers and roads that could have been used as escape routes. Colombian Navy ships were stationed offshore to prevent any escape by sea. Colombian military forces subsequently captured Úsuga, who was revealed to be hiding in a remote mountainous area.  Úsuga was captured the afternoon of October 23, and at the time of his arrest, Úsuga was the most wanted drug lord in Colombia, with the Colombian government issuing an $800,000 bounty for his capture. He was also revealed to still be involved in trafficking, though his cartel by this point was severely weakened.

He was heard in mid-February 2022 by the Special Jurisdiction for Peace (JEP), where he reportedly said he had organized his surrender and worked with the Colombian army, according to leaked media reports. The police interrupted the hearing, claiming to suspect Otoniel of planning his escape. Digital recordings containing his testimony to the JEP were later stolen.

On 4 May 2022 Úsuga was extradited to the United States.

References

20th-century births
Living people
Colombian drug traffickers
1971 births
People from Antioquia Department